Sir James Sexton CBE (13 April 1856 – 27 December 1938) was a British trade unionist and politician.

Sexton was born in Newcastle upon Tyne on 13 April 1856 to an Irish-born family of market traders, who soon moved to St Helens, Lancashire. After leaving school he worked in a variety of jobs, including as a seaman and in a chemical factory, before becoming a docker on Liverpool Docks. In 1884 he set up his own business as a coal merchant. In 1889 he joined the new National Union of Dock Labourers (later National Union of Dock, Riverside and General Workers) and was elected General Secretary in 1893, defeating James Larkin. He held this post until the union joined the Transport and General Workers' Union in 1922, whereupon he became National Supervisor of the Docks Trade Group of the new union. He retired from the TGWU in 1928.

A founder member of the Independent Labour Party, he later joined the Labour Party. He stood unsuccessfully for Liverpool West Toxteth in 1906 and then served as Labour Member of Parliament for St Helens from 1918 to 1931. He also sat on Liverpool City Council from 1905 until his death. Up to 1930 Sexton was elected for the St Anne's ward then was replaced by Bessie Braddock before becoming an alderman.

He was appointed Commander of the Order of the British Empire (CBE) in 1917 and knighted in 1931. In 1934 he was granted the freedom of the City of Liverpool.
His autobiography, Sir James Sexton, Agitator: The Life of the Dockers' M.P., was published by Faber and Faber in 1936, with a preface by David Lloyd George.

James Sexton died on 27 December 1938 at Liverpool, aged 82 years.

References

External links 
 

Politicians from Newcastle upon Tyne
Trade unionists from Newcastle upon Tyne
Trade unionists from Merseyside
People from St Helens, Merseyside
English people of Irish descent
British trade union leaders
Independent Labour Party politicians
Labour Party (UK) MPs for English constituencies
Commanders of the Order of the British Empire
Knights Bachelor
UK MPs 1918–1922
UK MPs 1922–1923
UK MPs 1923–1924
UK MPs 1924–1929
UK MPs 1929–1931
1856 births
1938 deaths
Members of the Parliamentary Committee of the Trades Union Congress
Presidents of the Trades Union Congress
Councillors in Liverpool
Transport and General Workers' Union-sponsored MPs